Gehrels is a surname. Notable people with this surname include:
 Franz Gehrels (1922–2018), German-American economist and university teacher
 Jürgen Gehrels (born 1935), German businessman
 Neil Gehrels (1952–2017), American astrophysicist
 Tom Gehrels (1925–2011),  Dutch–American astronomer